is a Japanese animator and director, who is known for his key animation works from Studio Ghibli.

Career
Momose was recruited by Studio Ghibli in 1988 to provide layout and other duties for Grave of the Fireflies. He later provided key animations for Porco Rosso, Whisper of the Heart, and Spirited Away.

In 2004, Momose made his directorial debut on two short films, Portable Airport and Space Station No. 9. In 2005, while continuing to work at Ghibli, Momose formed his own studio, Studio Kajino.

In 2010, Momose served as a character designer, cutscene animation director and storyboard for Ni no Kuni: Dominion of the Dark Djinn, which was released on Nintendo DS. The enhanced version of the game was released a year later on PlayStation 3, titled Ni no Kuni: Wrath of the White Witch. Momose later character designed the game's sequel, Ni no Kuni II: Revenant Kingdom. In 2019, Momose directed NiNoKuni at OLM, Inc.

In 2021, it was announced that Momose will direct The Imaginary film at Studio Ponoc.

Works

Film

Video game

Bibliography

References

External links

1953 births
Living people
Japanese animators
Japanese animated film directors
Studio Ghibli people
Artists from Tokyo